Cefn Gwyntog is a top of Cyrniau Nod in north east Wales. It forms a part of the Berwyn range known as the Hirnantau. Its summit lies just outside the Snowdonia National Park.

The views from the summit are extensive, if unremarkable due to the featureless, flat moorland surroundings. LLyn Efyrnwy (Lake Vyrnwy) can be seen below.  The summit is marked by a small cairn surrounded by peat bog and knee deep heather.

Cefn Gwyntog is renowned as one of the hardest summits in Wales to reach, due to its remoteness and hard walking terrain.

References

External links 

Hewitts of Wales
Mountains and hills of Gwynedd
Nuttalls

cy:Cyrniau Nod